The Ministry of National Education is the national executive ministry of the Government of Colombia responsible for overseeing the instruction and education of the Colombian people, similar to education ministries in other countries.

List of Ministers

References

External links
 Ministry of National Education
 Ministry of National Education 

Colombia
Education
Educational organisations based in Colombia
Colombia, Education